Puncturella agger is a species of sea snail, a marine gastropod mollusk in the family Fissurellidae, the keyhole limpets.

Description

The shell can grow to be 6 mm in length.

Distribution
This species occurs in the Gulf of Mexico and off Puerto Rico at depths between 249 m and 1966 m

References

 Rosenberg, G., F. Moretzsohn, and E. F. García. 2009. Gastropoda (Mollusca) of the Gulf of Mexico, Pp. 579–699 in Felder, D.L. and D.K. Camp (eds.), Gulf of Mexico–Origins, Waters, and Biota. Biodiversity. Texas A&M Press, College Station, Texas

External links
  Intergovernmental Oceanographic Commission (IOC) of UNESCO. The Ocean Biogeographic Information System
 Watson R.B. (1879-1883). Mollusca of H.M.S. 'Challenger' Expedition. Journal of the Linnean Society (London). 14: 506-529, 586-605, 692-716 [1879; 15: 87-126, 217-230 [1880], 245-274, 388-412, 413-455, 457-475 [1881]; 16: 247-254, 324-343, 358-372, 373-392 [1882], 594-611 [1883]; 17: 26-40, 112-130, 284-293, 319-340, 341-346]
 Pérez Farfante, I. (1947). The genera Zeidora, Nesta, Emarginula, Rimula and Puncturella in the western Atlantic. Johnsonia. 2: 93-148
 Watson R.B. (1886). Report on the Scaphopoda and Gasteropoda collected by H.M.S. Challenger during the years 1873-76. Report on the Scientific Results of the Voyage of H.M.S. Challenger during the years 1873–76. Zoology. 15 (part 42): 1-756, pls 1-50
  Serge GOFAS, Ángel A. LUQUE, Joan Daniel OLIVER,José TEMPLADO & Alberto SERRA (2021) - The Mollusca of Galicia Bank (NE Atlantic Ocean); European Journal of Taxonomy 785: 1–114

Fissurellidae
Gastropods described in 1883